The 24th Sarasaviya Awards festival (Sinhala: 24වැනි සරසවිය සම්මාන උලෙළ), presented by the Associated Newspapers of Ceylon Limited, was held to honor the best films of 1995 Sinhala cinema on September 1, 1996, at the Bandaranaike Memorial International Conference Hall, Colombo 07, Sri Lanka. Minister Dharmasiri Senanayake was the chief guest at the awards night.

The film Seilama won the ten prestigious awards including Best Film.

Awards

References

Sarasaviya Awards
Sarasaviya